The Regina Catholic School Division (RCSD), also known as Regina Catholic Schools, is a Roman Catholic school district headquartered in Regina, Saskatchewan.

The school board has seven members, and all candidates for election to the school board run in a single campaign as the board is at large.

In 2020 the board had more new members than returning members.

Schools
 Secondary
 Dr. Martin LeBoldus Catholic High School
 Archbishop M.C. O'Neill Catholic High School
 Miller Comprehensive Catholic High School
 Michael A. Riffel Catholic High School

 Primary
 Deshaye Catholic School
 École St. Angela Merici
 École St. Elizabeth - In East Regina, it opened in 2018.
 École St. Mary
 École St. Pius
 Holy Rosary Community School
 In 2021 the school district began considering closing the school.
 Sacred Heart Community School
 St. Augustine Community School
 St. Bernadette School
 St. Catherine Community School
 St. Dominic Savio School
 St. Francis Community School
 St. Gabriel School
 St. Gregory School
 St. Jerome School
 St. Joan of Arc School
 St. Josaphat School
 St. Kateri Tekakwitha School
 St. Marguerite Bourgeoys School
 St. Matthew School
 St. Michael Community School
 St. Nicholas School
 St. Peter School
 St. Theresa School
 St. Timothy School

 Alternative
 St. Maria Faustina School
 St. Luke School
It also has an online school

 Contract
 Mother Teresa Middle School

Former schools
 St. Andrew School - Built in 1958, renovated in 2010, and closed in 2018. The building in the fall was occupied by a Conseil des écoles fransaskoises school, École du Parc. The Catholic board owns the facility and is leasing it to the French school board. The school will close circa 2023 when a new French language school will open in north Regina.

See also
 List of schools in Regina, Saskatchewan

References

External links
 Regina Catholic Schools
 Articles about Regina Catholic Schools - Leader Post

School divisions in Saskatchewan
Education in Regina, Saskatchewan